Rita Island is a coastal and rural locality in the Shire of Burdekin, Queensland, Australia.

Geography 
The Burdekin River breaks into two branches as it approaches the Coral Sea and Rita Island is the island that lies between the two branches.

Road and rail access is via the Anabranch Bridge across the northern anabranch, which can be inaccessible if the Burdekin River is in flood.

The land use is predominantly growing sugarcane. There is a cane tramway network to transport the harvested sugarcane to the Kalamia sugar mill in Brandon.

History 

Education 
There are no schools in Rita Island. The nearest government primary school is Jarvisfield State School in neighbouring Jarvisfield to the north-west. The nearest government secondary school is Ayr State High School in Ayr to the north-west.

Facilities 
Rita Island SES Facility is at 3 Jones Road.

Hell Hole Landing boat ramp is at Hodder Road. It is managed by the Burdekin Shire Council.

References 

Shire of Burdekin
Coastline of Queensland
Localities in Queensland